Terry-Ketcham Inn is a historic inn and tavern located at Center Moriches in Suffolk County, New York.  It was built about 1693, expanded about 1710 and 1790, and is a two-story, nine by two bay frame structure with a rear wing and gable roof.  The original structure was built as a two by three bay, single story timber frame cottage.  In about 1710 a three by two bay timber frame half-house was built to the north of the original structure.  A 1790 building program tripled the size of the structure.

It was added to the National Register of Historic Places in 1993, and is protected by the New York State Office of Parks, Recreation and Historic Preservation. A historic barn behind the inn is used to sell books, records, and compact discs in order to raise funds for the Ketcham Inn Foundation.

Gallery

References

External links
The Ketcham Inn Foundation, Inc. website

Hotel buildings on the National Register of Historic Places in New York (state)
Federal architecture in New York (state)
Hotel buildings completed in the 17th century
Buildings and structures in Suffolk County, New York
National Register of Historic Places in Suffolk County, New York
Taverns on the National Register of Historic Places in New York (state)
Buildings and structures completed in 1693
Center Moriches Historic District
National Register of Historic Places in Brookhaven (town), New York